Royengyot Srivorapongpant (born 2 May 1953) is a Thai fencer. He competed in the team épée and individual and team sabre events at the 1976 Summer Olympics.

References

External links
 

1953 births
Living people
Royengyot Srivorapongpant
Royengyot Srivorapongpant
Fencers at the 1976 Summer Olympics
Royengyot Srivorapongpant
Royengyot Srivorapongpant